Tinahely Gaelic Athletic Association is a Gaelic football and ladies' Gaelic football club based in Tinahely, County Wicklow, Republic of Ireland.

History

GAA activity in Tinahely is first recorded in 1886. The club was revived as St. Patricks in 1911 and won their first senior county title in 1917. The club lapsed out of existence around 1924, being revived in 1961, which is the date on the current club crest.

Tinahely won the county championship in 1984 and advanced to the final of the Leinster Senior Club Football Championship, losing to St Vincents.

Honours

Gaelic football
 Wicklow Senior Football Championship (3): 1917, 1919, 1984
 Wicklow Intermediate Football Championship (1): 2005
 Wicklow Junior Football Championship (1): 1969

Notable people
Eoin Darcy
Luke O'Toole, Secretary-General of the Gaelic Athletic Association 1901–29

References

External links
Official website

Gaelic games clubs in County Wicklow
Gaelic football clubs in County Wicklow